The list shows airports that are served by Hebei Airlines as part of its scheduled passenger services. The list includes the city, country, the codes of the International Air Transport Association (IATA airport code) and the International Civil Aviation Organization (ICAO airport code), and the airport's name, with the airline's hubs and terminated stations marked.

List

References

Lists of airline destinations